Frederick Abbott Stokes (November 4, 1857 – November 15, 1939) was an American publisher, founder and long-time head of the eponymous Frederick A. Stokes Company.

Biography

Stokes graduated from Yale Law School in 1879. He worked at Dodd, Mead and Company for a year and in 1881 established White & Stokes, a partnership that became the Frederick A. Stokes Company in 1890. The Stokes businesses published more than 3,000 books in his 58 years, 1881 to 1939.

Stokes published established writers such as Frances Hodgson Burnett, Frank Buck, and Stephen Crane. He also published beginning writers such as James Branch Cabell, Maria Montessori, and Percival Wren.  Best sellers included: The Story of Ferdinand, On Jungle Trails, Doctor Dolittle, When Worlds Collide, Guys and Dolls, and The Story of Little Black Sambo. Stokes was also known for publishing high quality art and children's books, such as "The Glue Books", a popular 17-volume series beginning with The House That Glue Built in 1905.

Stokes was an opponent of the new Book Clubs of the 1920s, and of modern advertising methods such as billboards and radio ads.

Stokes died 1939, at age 82, in his home at 344 West 72nd Street, Manhattan. Many prominent people from the book industry attended his funeral service at the Church of the Incarnation (Episcopal). He was buried at Green-Wood Cemetery in Brooklyn.

Stokes left the publishing company to his sons Horace Winston and Frederick Brett, who were then the company treasurer and secretary. J. B. Lippincott acquired it in 1943.

Authors
Authors' names are followed by dates of their known association with Frederick A. Stokes.

Writers

Helen Bannerman, 1900
 Louis Bromfield, 1926
 Frank Buck, 1936
 Frances Hodgson Burnett, 1901
 James Branch Cabell
 Stephen Crane, 1899
 Edward S. Curtis, 1912
 Glenn Curtiss, 1912
 Ferrin Fraser, 1936
 Susan Glaspell, 1909–1931
 Owen Johnson. 1912–1915
 Munro Leaf, 1934–1942
 Lois Lenski, 1929–1943
 J. Thomas Looney, 1870 – 1944
 Sinclair Lewis, 1910–1912
 Hugh Lofting, 1920–1936
 Mary MacLane, 1917
 Elizabeth Cooper, 1914-1927

 Maria Montessori, 1912–1917
 L. M. Montgomery, 1917–1939
 Richard F. Outcault, 1904–1914
 Robert E. Peary, 1898–1912
 John J. Pershing, 1931
 Olive Higgins Prouty, 1919
 Ivana Brlić-Mažuranić, 1922
 Ellery Queen, 1929–1940
 Edward V. Rickenbacker, 1919
 W. Heath Robinson, 1925
 Damon Runyon, 1931–1938
 Walter C. Sweeney, Sr., 1924
 William M. Timlin, 1923
 Clara Andrews Williams, 1905–1926
 Percival Wren, 1925–1933
 Lee Wulff, 1939
 Philip Wylie, 1933–1934

Illustrators
 Joseph M. Gleeson, 
 Maria Louise Kirk, 1904–1927
 George Alfred Williams, 1905–1926

See also

Pocket Magazine, published by Stokes

References

Further reading
 Frederick A. Stokes Company, The House of Stokes, 1881–1926: A Record, New York: Frederick A. Stokes Company, 1926.

External links

 
 Frederick A. Stokes Company at LC Authorities, 91 records
 

American book publishers (people)
People from Brooklyn
1857 births
1939 deaths
Yale Law School alumni
Burials at Green-Wood Cemetery